was a Japanese actress.  She was diagnosed with Alzheimer's disease in November 2008, and a television documentary was made about her condition and the efforts of her husband, actor Hiroyuki Nagato, to care for her.  She died in Tokyo.

Selected filmography 
Her filmography includes 140 films.

 Himitsu (1952) - Eiko
 Jūdai no yūwaku (1953) - Fusae Nishikawa
 Zoku Jûdai no seiten (1953) - Akiko Yasutomi
 Zoku zoku Jûdai no seiten (1953) - Setsuko Azabu
 Yonin no haha (1954)
 Kimimachi-bune (1954) - Kyôko Tazaki
 The Crucified Lovers (1954) - Otama
 Bara ikutabika (1955) - Mitsuko Matsushima
 Princess Yang Kwei-Fei (1955) - Hung-tao
 Sara no hana no toge (1955) - Toshiko Takenaka
 Haha naki ko (1955) - Tomiko
 Tokyo baka odori (1956)
 Season of the Sun (1956) - Eiko Takeda
 Waga machi (1956)
 Tonari no yome (1956)
 Ueru tamashii (1956) - Reiko Shiba
 Hungry Soul, Part II (1956) - Reiko Shiba
 Tange Sazen: Kenun no maki (1956)
 Otemba san'nin shimai: Odoru taiyô (1957)
 Sun in the Last Days of the Shogunate (1957) - Koharu, the prostitute
 Bitoku no yoromeki (1957) - Woman looks like an actress
 Shori-sha (1957)
 Kokoro to nikutai no tabi (1958) - Naomi Inamura
 Nusumareta yokujô (1958) - Chidori Yamamura
 Ginza no sabaku (1958) - Rika Kusunoki
 Kagenaki koe (1958) - Asako Takahashi
 Shî no kâbe no dâsshutsû (1958)
 Onna o wasurero (1959) - Yukie
 Kyo ni ikiru (1959)
 Sekai o kakeru koi (1959) - Kaoru Nonomura
 Yuganda tsuki (1959) - Namiko Eda
 Nangoku Tosa o ato ni shite (1959) - Hamako
 Jigoku no magarikado (1959) - Takako
 Nirenjû no tetsu (1959)
 Kizû tsukeru yajû (1959)
 Kizû darakê no ôkite (1960)
 Yakuza no uta (1960) - Yumi Kitano
 Wataridori itsu mata kaeru
 Chizu no naimachi (1960)
 Umi no joji ni kakero (1960) - Yuriko Kwamura
 Kenju burai-chō Asunaki Otoko (1960) - Sumi
 Ippiki ôkami (1960)
 Daisogen no wataridori (1960)
 Pigs and Battleships (1961) - Katsuyo
 Tokyo naito (1961)
 Hayauchi yarô (1961) - Dancer Jane
 Rokudenashi kagyo (1961)
 Sandanju no otoko (1961)
 Akai kôya (1961) - Sakie Yazaki
 Kachan umi ga shitteru yo (1961)
 Yôjinbo kagyô (1961)
 Nosappu no jô (1961)
 Otoko to otoko no ikiru machi (1962) - Emi Iwasaki
 Moeru minamijûjisei (1962) - Akemi
 Wataridori kokyô e kaeru (1962) - Misato Matsuyama
 Ore ni kaketa yatsura (1962)
 Garasu no Jonî: Yajû no yô ni miete (1962) - Yumi
 Aoi sanmyaku (1963) - Umetaro
 Samurai no ko (1963)
 Taiyo e no dasshutsu (1963)
 Izu no odoriko (1963) - Osaki
 Kiriko no tango (1963) - Tae
 Kyuchan katana o nuite (1963)
 Keirin shônin gyôjyôki (1963) - Monoko Ban
 Okashina yatsu (1963) - Fujiko, Shuntô
 Ôre no senaka ni higa atarô (1963)
 Zoku Haikei Tenno Heika Sama (1964) - Miri
 Jakoman to Tetsu (1964)
 Narazumono (1964)
 Nihon kyôkaku-den (1964) - Kumeji
 Korosareta onna (1964)
 Kawachi zoro: kenja jamo (1964)
 Kawachi zoro: doke chichu (1964)
 Bakuto (1964)
 Nihon Kyokaku-den: naniwa-hen (1965)
 Irezumi (1965)
 Nihon Kyokaku-den: kanto-hen (1965)
 Kawachi zoro: abare cho (1965)
 Ankoku gai jingi (1965)
 Otoko no shôbu (1966)
 Jigoku no okite ni asu wa nai (1966) - Akemi
 Chieko-sho (1967) - Kazuko
 Nihon kyokaku-den: kirikomi (1967)
 Kigeki meoto zenzai (1968)
 Nihon zan kyôsen (1969)
 Nihon zankyô-den (1969)
 Bakuto hyakunin - ninkyodo (1969)
 Hiko shonen: Wakamono no toride (1970) - Fusa Morokoshi
 Junko intai kinen eiga: Kantô hizakura ikka (1972) - Maid
 Karafuto 1945 Summer Hyosetsu no mon (1974)
 Hana no kô-ni trio: Hatsukoi jidai (1975) - Keiko Yazawa
 Nihon no jingi (1977) - Toyoko
 House (1977) - Auntie Karei Hausu
 Furimukeba ai (1978) - Tomi Oguchi
 Mahiru nari (1978)
 Zerosen moyu (1984) - Ine Hamada
 Rimeinzu: Utsukushiki yuusha-tachi (1990) - Kiyo
 Yuki no Concerto (1991)
 Riyû (2004) - Kinue Ishida
 Ghost Shout (2005)
 22 sai no wakare - Lycoris: Ha mizu hana mizu monogatari (2006) - (final film role)

References

External links
 

1933 births
2009 deaths
Japanese film actresses
20th-century Japanese actresses
21st-century Japanese actresses
Deaths from dementia in Japan
Deaths from Alzheimer's disease
Asadora lead actors